The 56th Guldbagge Awards ceremony, presented by the Swedish Film Institute, honoring the best Swedish films of 2020 and took place on 25 January 2021 at Annexet in Stockholm. The ceremony was televised by SVT, and was hosted by comedian David Sundin and television host Amie Bramme Sey. The nominees were presented on 17 December 2020.

As a result of the COVID-19 pandemic, the Guldbagge Awards has changed its rules for this years ceremony. Now it doesn't matter if the films had a theatrical release or if it was dropped on a streaming service. However, the film must have been reviewed by at least five different sources out of fifteen possible, and it must be at least an hour long.

Winners and nominees 
The nominees for the 56th Guldbagge Awards were announced on 17 December 2020 in Stockholm, by the Swedish Film Institute.

Awards 

Winners are listed first and highlighted in '''boldface.

Films with multiple nominations and awards

See also 
 93rd Academy Awards
 78th Golden Globe Awards
 74th British Academy Film Awards
 27th Screen Actors Guild Awards
 26th Critics' Choice Awards
 25th Satellite Awards
 41st Golden Raspberry Awards

References

External links 
 
Guldbaggen on Facebook
Guldbaggen on Twitter
56th Guldbagge Awards at Internet Movie Database

2021 in Swedish cinema
2020 film awards
Guldbagge Awards ceremonies
2020s in Stockholm
January 2021 events in Sweden